Hussein Jamil Makhlouf (born 1964) is a Syrian politician. He is currently Local Administration and Environment Minister.

Career
Occupied several posts at the Coast Company for Construction and Building and the General Establishment of Construction and Building, and chaired a project for expanding Lattakia port.

Director of Water Resources Department (2006-2011), chairing joint committees with Lebanon, Jordan, and Turkey on water affairs.

He was Governor of the Damascus Countryside Governate from 2011 to 2016.

References 

Living people
1964 births
Arab Socialist Ba'ath Party – Syria Region politicians

Syrian ministers of local administration
21st-century Syrian politicians
Tishreen University alumni